Meade is a city in and the county seat of Meade County, Kansas, United States.  As of the 2020 census, the population of the city was 1,505.

History
Meade was both laid out and incorporated in 1885. It was named for Gen. George Meade.

Geography

Climate
According to the Köppen Climate Classification system, Meade has a semi-arid climate, abbreviated "BSk" on climate maps.

Demographics

2010 census
As of the census of 2010, there were 1,721 people, 670 households, and 454 families living in the city. The racial makeup of the city was 95.4% White, 1.0% African American, 0.6% Native American, 0.5% Asian, 1.1% from other races, and 1.3% from two or more races. Hispanic or Latino of any race were 6.1% of the population.

There were 670 households, of which 32.7% had children under the age of 18 living with them, 55.5% were married couples living together, 8.2% had a female householder with no husband present, 4.0% had a male householder with no wife present, and 32.2% were non-families. 29.1% of all households were made up of individuals, and 17.1% had someone living alone who was 65 years of age or older. The average household size was 2.42 and the average family size was 2.98.

The median age in the city was 41.3 years. 26.7% of residents were under the age of 18; 6.4% were between the ages of 18 and 24; 21.2% were from 25 to 44; 24.6% were from 45 to 64; and 21.2% were 65 years of age or older. The gender makeup of the city was 50.6% male and 49.4% female.

2000 census
As of the census of 2000, there were 1,672 people, 654 households, and 451 families living in the city. The racial makeup of the city was 94.20% White, 0.60% African American, 0.48% Native American, 0.42% Asian, 3.23% from other races, and 1.08% from two or more races. Hispanic or Latino of any race were 5.56% of the population.

There were 654 households, out of which 33.2% had children under the age of 18 living with them, 60.6% were married couples living together, 5.7% had a female householder with no husband present, and 31.0% were non-families. 29.4% of all households were made up of individuals, and 17.7% had someone living alone who was 65 years of age or older. The average household size was 2.44 and the average family size was 3.03.

In the city, the population was spread out, with 26.7% under the age of 18, 5.9% from 18 to 24, 25.7% from 25 to 44, 19.4% from 45 to 64, and 22.2% who were 65 years of age or older. The median age was 40 years. For every 100 females, there were 91.5 males. For every 100 females age 18 and over, there were 89.6 males.

The median income for a household in the city was $32,583, and the median income for a family was $40,357. Males had a median income of $27,813 versus $20,764 for females. The per capita income for the city was $15,910. About 3.9% of families and 5.7% of the population were below the poverty line, including 4.6% of those under age 18 and 8.3% of those age 65 or over.

Arts and culture
Located in Meade is the Dalton Gang Hideout and Museum, the outlaws who robbed banks and trains in the nineteenth century.

References

Further reading

External links

 City of Meade
 Meade - Directory of Public Officials
 USD 226, local school district
 Photos of early Meade
 Photos of Meade schools
 Meade City Map, KDOT

Cities in Kansas
County seats in Kansas
Cities in Meade County, Kansas
1885 establishments in Kansas
Populated places established in 1885